Mahamat Idriss Déby Itno (born 1 January 1984), also known as Mahamat Kaka, is a Chadian army general serving as the transitional president of Chad. He is the son of the late Chadian President Idriss Déby. He gained power as the president of the Transitional Military Council on 20 April 2021 when his father died in action while commanding troops in the Northern Chad offensive. He previously served as the second-in-command of the military for the Chadian Intervention in Northern Mali (FATIM).

Early and personal life 
Mahamat Déby is polygamous and has three wives. His first wife is an ethnic Zaghawa woman. In 2010, Déby married his second wife, a Central African woman and the daughter of Abakar Sabon—a former Central African Republic government minister, advisor to Michel Djotodia, and leader of the Movement of Central African Liberators for Justice rebel group. It is believed that Déby and his second wife have five children.

Mahamat Déby's third wife, Dahabaya Oumar Souni, is a journalist and media advisor who is considered the First Lady of Chad. Souni worked closely with her late father-in-law, President Idriss Déby, and was promoted to director of public relations for the office of the presidency from December 2019 until his death. In May 2021, Dahabaya Oumar Souni was appointed as media advisor to the presidency of the Transitional Military Council and now works alongside her husband, President Mahamat Déby, as a member of his group of technical advisors.

Military career
Mahamat Déby first enrolled at the Joint Grouping of military schools in Chad. He subsequently received training in France, at the military school of Aix-en-Provence. Upon his return he was enrolled in second promotion of semi direct of the school of officer inter arme and later was appointed to the service branch for the Security of State Institutions (SERS), as a deputy commander of the groupement of infenterie. His first combat experience took place in April 2006 when rebels attacked the capital city of Chad and later participated in combat in eastern Chad along with General Abu Bakr al Said, then director of gendarmery, Mahamat was given the rank of major afterward. He led forces when he took part in the command of Chadian forces during the Battle of Am Dam, where his army defeated the rebels.

Following his victory, he was appointed in command of the armored squadrons and bodyguards of the SERS. In January 2013, he was appointed second in command of the Chadian special forces in Mali under general Oumar Bikimo. On 22 February, he led his army against rebels in the Adrar al-Ifoghas mountains in Northern Mali leading to the Battle of al-Ifoghas. They eliminated a rebel base said to be of "significant importance", inflicting heavy losses upon the rebels but also losing twenty-six men in the process, including Abdel Aziz Hassane Adam, a commander of special forces. Mahamat took full command of the FATIM and has since been leading operations against rebels in the North.

President of the Transitional Military Council

After Mahamat's father, Idriss Déby, died at the hands of FACT on 20 April 2021, the military announced that the elected government and National Assembly have been dissolved and that a Transitional Military Council led by Mahamat will lead the nation for 18 months. A new charter replaced the Constitution of Chad, making Mahamat the interim President and head of the armed forces.

Some political actors within Chad have labeled the installing of the transitional military government a "coup", as the constitutional provisions regarding the filling of a presidential vacancy were not followed. Namely, according to the constitution, the President of the National Assembly, Haroun Kabadi, should have been named Acting President after president Idriss Déby's death, and an early election called within a period of no less than 45 and no more than 90 days from the time of the vacancy. However, one of Chad's main foreign policy allies, France, has defended the development as necessary, citing the "exceptional circumstances" caused by the rebellion. Furthermore, the FACT rebels have issued an open threat to the new government, stating that "Chad is not a monarchy" and vowing to continue fighting until they reach N'Djamena and depose Mahamat Déby from power.

After initially refusing to negotiate with insurgent groups, Déby softened his stance in August 2021, proposing a national dialogue. After his proposal was met with approval by rebel groups, talks between government and rebel representatives started two months later. The national dialogue between Déby's government and the opposition was supposed to prepare the country for elections scheduled for the second half of 2022. However, those elections were postponed until at least October 2024.

See also
Military of Chad

References

Living people
Chadian Muslims
1984 births
Heads of state of Chad
20th-century Chadian politicians
Generals
Chadian military leaders
Sons of national leaders
People from Hadjer-Lamis Region
Chadian anti-communists